Richard J. Coffee (February 14, 1925 – February 19, 2017) was an American Democratic Party politician from New Jersey who served in the New Jersey Senate and as chairman of the New Jersey Democratic State Committee.

Biography
Coffee was born in 1925 in Lawrence Township, Mercer County, New Jersey. He attended Princeton High School and the Merchant Marine Academy. He served as an ensign in the Merchant Marine during World War II.

His political career began in 1954 when he was elected to the Lawrence Township Committee. He served as Mayor of Lawrence Township, Mercer County, New Jersey, in 1957. He was elected to the Mercer County Board of Chosen Freeholders in 1955 and served for 12 years. As freeholder, Coffee fought to establish a park system for Mercer County. He was instrumental in the creation of the Mercer County Park Commission in 1964. He also helped establish Mercer County Community College in 1966.

In 1967, he was elected to the New Jersey Senate for a four-year term. In the Senate he was a member of the Joint Appropriations Committee and the Assistant Minority Leader. He went on to serve 17 years as Executive Director of the General Assembly Democratic Office.

Coffee served as Mercer County Democratic chairman from 1969 to 1981, and was the state chairman from 1977 to 1981.

On October 15, 2009, Coffee was honored by Mercer County Park, which was renamed Richard J. Coffee Mercer County Park in his honor for acquiring the land in the 1950s.

Coffee died on February 19, 2017, in Plainsboro, New Jersey.

References

External links
Biographical information for Richard J. Coffee from The Political Graveyard

1925 births
2017 deaths
United States Merchant Mariners of World War II
Chairmen of the New Jersey Democratic State Committee
Mayors of places in New Jersey
County commissioners in New Jersey
Democratic Party New Jersey state senators
People from Lawrence Township, Mercer County, New Jersey
Politicians from Mercer County, New Jersey
United States Merchant Marine Academy alumni
Military personnel from New Jersey
Princeton High School (New Jersey) alumni
United States Navy officers